Virginia Balistrieri also credited as Virginia Balestrieri (15 January 1888 – 7 December 1960) was an Italian stage and film actress. She was married to the actor Giovanni Grasso. In 1914 she starred in the silent film Lost in the Dark, seen as a forerunner of Italian neorealism. In the post-Second World War years she worked as a character actress in productions such as the 1950 religious film Margaret of Cortona.

Selected filmography
 Lost in the Dark (1914)
 No Man's Land (1939)
 Hawk of the Nile (1950)
 The Outlaws (1950)
 Welcome, Reverend! (1950)
 The Cliff of Sin (1950)
 Margaret of Cortona (1950)
 Fatal Desire (1953)
 Mermaid of Naples (1956)

References

Bibliography
 Ann C. Paietta. Saints, Clergy and Other Religious Figures on Film and Television, 1895-2003. McFarland, 2005.

External links

1888 births
1960 deaths
People from Trapani
Italian film actresses
Italian silent film actresses
20th-century Italian actresses